Joseph Steven Atang Thompson (born 14 February 1989) is a Nigerian football player currently with Shabab Al-Ghazieh.

Career 
Thompson began his career with Cotonsport Garoua as a member of the Rudder Sports Management and moved in 2008 to Enyimba International F.C., after only one year he signed with Kano Pillars F.C. On 6 January 2011 was linked with Sporting Kansas City. He returned to Enyimba following the end of the 2012 season.

International 
He has played with the Nigeria national under-20 football team.

References

1989 births
Living people
Nigerian footballers
Association football midfielders
Coton Sport FC de Garoua players
Enyimba F.C. players
Expatriate footballers in Cameroon
Kano Pillars F.C. players
Chabab Ghazieh SC players